The 2022–23 Magyar Kupa (English: Hungarian Cup) is the 83rd season of Hungary's annual knock-out cup football competition. The title holders were Ferencváros by winning the 2022 Magyar Kupa Final.

Match times up to 30 October 2022 and from 26 March 2023 were CEST (UTC+2). Times on interim ("winter") days were CET (UTC+1).

First round

Second round

Third round

Round of 32

Round of 16

Quarter-finals

Semi-finals

See also
 2022–23 Nemzeti Bajnokság I
 2022–23 Nemzeti Bajnokság II
 2022–23 Nemzeti Bajnokság III

References

External links
 Official site 
 soccerway.com

Cup
Hungary
Magyar Kupa seasons